Silicon Valley is an American comedy television series created by Mike Judge, John Altschuler and Dave Krinsky. It premiered on HBO on April 6, 2014, and concluded on December 8, 2019, running for six seasons for a total of 53 episodes. Parodying the culture of the technology industry in Silicon Valley, the series focuses on Richard Hendricks (Thomas Middleditch), a programmer who founds a startup company called Pied Piper, and chronicles his struggles to maintain his company while facing competition from larger entities. Co-stars include T.J. Miller, Josh Brener, Martin Starr, Kumail Nanjiani, Zach Woods, Amanda Crew, Matt Ross, and Jimmy O. Yang.

The series received critical acclaim, with praise for its writing and humor. It was nominated for numerous accolades, including five consecutive Primetime Emmy Award nominations for Outstanding Comedy Series.

Plot

Season 1

Richard Hendricks, an employee of a tech company named Hooli, creates in his spare time an app called Pied Piper that contains a revolutionary data compression algorithm. Peter Gregory acquires a stake in Pied Piper, and Richard hires the residents of Erlich Bachman's business incubator, including Bertram Gilfoyle and Dinesh Chugtai, along with Jared Dunn, who also defected from Hooli. Meanwhile Richard's best friend, Nelson "Big Head" Bighetti, chooses to accept a substantial promotion at Hooli instead, despite his lack of merit for the job.

Gavin Belson instructs his Hooli employees to reverse engineer Pied Piper and develop a similar product called Nucleus. Both companies are scheduled to present at TechCrunch Disrupt. Pied Piper rushes to produce a feature-rich cloud storage platform based on their compression technology. At the TechCrunch event, Belson presents Nucleus, which is integrated with all of Hooli's services and has compression performance equal to Pied Piper. However, Richard has a new idea and spends the entire night coding. The next morning, he makes Pied Piper's final presentation and demonstrates a product that strongly outperforms Nucleus; he is then mobbed by eager investors.

Season 2

In the immediate aftermath of their TechCrunch Disrupt victory, multiple venture capital firms offer to finance Pied Piper's Series A round. Peter Gregory has died and is replaced by Laurie Bream to run Raviga Capital. Richard finds out that Hooli is suing Pied Piper for copyright infringement, falsely claiming that Richard developed Pied Piper's compression algorithm on Hooli time using company equipment. As a result, Raviga and all the other VC firms retract their offers. Richard turns down Hooli's buyout and accepts funding from controversial billionaire Russ Hanneman, though Richard quickly begins questioning his decision after learning about Hanneman's mercurial reputation and his excessive interference in day-to-day operations.

Belson promotes Big Head to Hooli [xyz], to make people think he created the compression algorithm and that Richard stole it to create Pied Piper. Belson agrees to drop the lawsuit in favor of binding arbitration to prevent the press from finding out about how bad Nucleus is. Due to a clause in Richard's Hooli contract, the lawsuit is ruled in Pied Piper's favor. Raviga buys out Hanneman's stake in Pied Piper, securing three of Pied Piper's five board seats. However, they decide to remove Richard from the CEO position due to previous incidents.

Season 3

After a failed stint with Jack Barker as CEO of Pied Piper, Richard eventually regains his CEO position. Due to Jack wasting all their money on offices and useless marketing, a cash strapped Richard hires contract engineers from around the world to help construct their application platform. Big Head receives a $20 million severance package from Hooli in exchange for non-disclosure and non-disparagement agreements. Big Head uses his money to set up his own incubator and Erlich partners with him. However, because of their spending habits, they declare bankruptcy, and Erlich is forced to sell his stake in Pied Piper to repay the debts. Gavin Belson hires Jack Barker as the new head of development at Hooli.

After release, their platform is positively reviewed by members of the industry. However, only a small fraction of the people installing the platform remain as daily active users due to its complex interface design. Meanwhile, Jared secretly employs a click farm to artificially inflate usage statistics. An anxious Richard reveals the source of the uptick at a Series B funding signing meeting, leading to the deal being scrapped. Laurie no longer wishes for Raviga to be associated with Pied Piper and moves to sell majority control to any investor. Erlich and Big Head are able to buy control of the company after an unexpected windfall from the sale of a blog they bought. Pied Piper now prepares to pivot again, this time to become a video chat company, based on the sudden popularity of Dinesh's video chat application which he included on the platform.

Season 4

Richard steps down as CEO of Pied Piper, and instead begins working on a new project: a decentralized, peer-to-peer internet, that would be powered by a network of cell phones without any firewalls, viruses, or government regulations. Gavin Belson is removed as CEO of Hooli after an incident involving COPPA violations from when he seized PiperChat. Jack Barker takes his place as CEO. Gavin temporarily works with Richard, until he has an existential crisis and leaves Palo Alto for Tibet.

Laurie and Monica form their own VC company, Bream-Hall. Big Head becomes a lecturer at Stanford University's Department of Computer Science. Erlich gets into business with Keenan Feldspar, whose VR headset is the Valley's latest sensation. However, Erlich is left out of a signing deal and is abandoned by Feldspar, leaving Erlich disillusioned. Erlich then goes to Tibet to meet with Gavin. Gavin meets up with Erlich in Tibet. Belson eventually returns home, while Erlich stays behind.

Richard gets into business with FGI, an insurance company, who uses Pied Piper for their data storage needs. After a crisis involving FGI's data storage, the team discovers that the decentralized internet is a working concept after the data from their Pied Piper server had backed itself up to Jian-Yang's smart refrigerator, as Gilfoyle used some of the Pied Piper code when he was trying to hack it, which in turn connected itself to a network of other refrigerators like it and distributing the data. Gavin ousts Jack from Hooli and regains his position as CEO. He offers a very generous acquisition deal to Richard, who turns it down and decides to be funded by Bream-Hall.

Season 5

In the fifth season, the Pied Piper team gets new offices and hires a large team of coders to help work on Richard's new internet. Meanwhile, Jian-Yang manages to convince a judge that Erlich is dead so that he can inherit Erlich's estate, including the idea incubator and the 10% share of Pied Piper. Richard promotes Jared to be the new chief operating officer for Pied Piper, and Jian-Yang goes to China to build a knock-off version of Pied Piper.

Bream-Hall forces Richard to team up with Eklow, an AI team, and Pied Piper puts together a group of developers. When Eklow's CEO almost destroys Pied Piper's credibility, Richard becomes fed up with Laurie and considers using Gilfoyle's idea to create a cryptocurrency for Pied Piper as a way to secure an independent source of funding. After initially opposing the idea, Monica realizes that Laurie plans to make Richard sell ads for his decentralized internet, and warns him. In gratitude, Richard offers her the newly vacated role of CFO at Pied Piper, and she accepts, finally cutting ties with Laurie.

After unimpressive results from their cryptocurrency, Pied Piper is distraught when Laurie teams up with a wealthy Chinese manufacturer, Yao, who had been working with Belson to steal Jian-Yang's Pied Piper patent. Yao and Laurie add users to Pied Piper's network via a large number of newly manufactured phones, and prepare for a 51% attack against Pied Piper's network in order to take control of developing it. Richard asks Belson to put their software onto Hooli's Signature Box 3 network in order to stop Yao and Laurie, and Belson does so, but betrays Richard by teaming up with Laurie and Yao to delete Pied Piper. At the last minute, Pied Piper recruits Colin, another developer betrayed by Laurie, to run his popular video game Gates of Galloo on the Pied Piper network, adding users and allowing Pied Piper to maintain control of enough of the network to block Yao's and Hooli's machines from accessing it. Meanwhile, due to the losses incurred in launching the unsuccessful Signature Box 3, Hooli's board of directors announce plans that force Belson to sell the company to Amazon and Jeff Bezos. PiedPiperCoin gains traction, and the season ends with the Pied Piper team moving into a huge new office space vacated by Hooli.

Season 6 

Pied Piper has become a large company of 500 employees with Richard speaking before Congress on his ideology of a new internet that doesn't collect user data. He is shocked to learn that Colin's online game Gates of Galloo, part of the Pied Piper family, has been collecting user data the entire time. Colin refuses to stop, but Pied Piper depends on his game's revenue, so Richard seeks new investment in order to cut Colin loose. He finds shady Chilean billionaire Maximo Reyes, who offers Richard $1 billion. When Richard turns him down, Maximo begins staging a hostile takeover of Pied Piper. Meanwhile, Richard's right-hand man Jared has left Pied Piper to seek a new up-and-coming talent in need of his support. Hooli, once a tech giant headed by Richard's rival Gavin Belson, downsizes drastically after most of the company is sold to Amazon. Pied Piper purchases what remains of Hooli, including its subsidiary FoxHole. CFIUS judges foreign ownership of FoxHole to be a threat to national security, and Maximo is forced to sell all of his shares of Pied Piper. Gavin, free from his Hooli position, launches a new campaign for "Tethics" (tech ethics) which leads to an investigation that would tie up Pied Piper's business dealings.  Richard is able to maneuver out of this with the help of Russ Hanneman.  However, Pied Piper must now help Russ with his music festival RussFest.  At RussFest, Richard suspects Laurie may be sabotaging their software as it is failing.  It turns out that neither Yao Net USA nor Pied Piper scale.  Instead of quitting, Richard integrates Gilfoyle's AI (with some edits from Dinesh) into PiperNet and it works better than anyone could have expected, allowing Pied Piper to close a deal with AT&T. However, the team soon realizes that in this effort to maximize compression and efficiency, PiperNet's AI has found a way to bypass all encryption, causing a potential global threat if launched.  Thus PiedPiper is forced to intentionally fail in order to save the world from their own creation. They are successful in crashing the launch.  There is a 10 year flash forward to see where everyone is, ending with Richard misplacing a flash drive with the potential world security-threatening code on it.

Cast and characters

 Thomas Middleditch as Richard Hendricks, a coder and founder/CEO of Pied Piper.
 T.J. Miller as Erlich Bachman (seasons 1–4), an entrepreneur who runs an innovation incubator in his house and owns 10% of Pied Piper.
 Josh Brener as Nelson "Big Head" Bighetti, Richard's best friend who works at Hooli. Despite possessing few skills as a programmer, he often finds himself being promoted and finding success.
 Martin Starr as Bertram Gilfoyle, the network engineer of Pied Piper who is known for his stolid and sardonic personality. He is a LaVeyan Satanist.
 Kumail Nanjiani as Dinesh Chugtai, a programmer specializing in Java and member of Pied Piper. He is often the victim of Gilfoyle's ridicule, pranks, and racist slurs and also delivers them in kind as he becomes obsessed with one-upmanship. 
 Christopher Evan Welch as Peter Gregory (season 1), the socially awkward billionaire founder and CEO of Raviga Capital as well as a 5% equity owner of Pied Piper after his $200,000 investment. 
 Amanda Crew as Monica Hall, an employee of Raviga Capital and associate partner.
 Zach Woods as Donald "Jared" Dunn, an ex-VP of Hooli who quits the company in order to join the Pied Piper team as its COO and business advisor.
 Matt Ross as Gavin Belson (seasons 2–6; recurring season 1), the CEO and founder of Hooli and the series' main antagonist.
 Suzanne Cryer as Laurie Bream (seasons 2–6), the replacement for Peter Gregory as CEO of Raviga Capital, and later co-founder of Bream Hall Capital with Monica. Like her predecessor, she is highly intelligent and socially inept.
 Jimmy O. Yang as Jian-Yang (seasons 2–6; recurring season 1), another tenant of Erlich's incubator, but has no involvement with Pied Piper. He and Erlich have frequent disagreements.
 Stephen Tobolowsky as "Action" Jack Barker (season 4; recurring season 3), briefly CEO of Pied Piper and later Hooli.
 Chris Diamantopoulos as Russ Hanneman (seasons 4, 6; recurring season 2–3; guest season 5), a brash, loud and fiery billionaire investor who provides Pied Piper with their Series A.

Production

Co-creator and executive producer Mike Judge had worked in a Silicon Valley startup early in his career. In 1987, he was a programmer at Parallax, a company with about 40 employees. Judge disliked the company's culture and his colleagues ("The people I met were like Stepford Wives. They were true believers in something and I don't know what it was") and quit after less than three months, but the experience gave him the background to later create a show about the region's people and companies. He recollects also how startup companies pitched to him to make a Flash-based animation in the past as material for the first episode: "It was one person after another going, 'In two years, you will not own a TV set!' I had a meeting that was like a gathering of acolytes around a cult leader. 'Has he met Bill?' 'Oh, I'm the VP and I only get to see Bill once a month.' And then another guy chimed in, 'For 10 minutes, but the 10 minutes is amazing!

The idea of Pied Piper is inspired by real attempts for creating a decentralized web by a company called MaidSafe. Several of its team members served as advisors and consulted on the series.

Filming for the pilot of Silicon Valley began on March 12, 2013, in Palo Alto, California. HBO green-lit the series on May 16, 2013.

Christopher Evan Welch, who played billionaire Peter Gregory, died in December 2013 of lung cancer, having finished his scenes for the first five episodes. The production team decided against recasting the role and reshooting his scenes; on his death, Judge commented: "The brilliance of Chris' performance is irreplaceable, and inspired us in our writing of the series." He went on to say, "The entire ordeal was heartbreaking. But we are incredibly grateful to have worked with him in the brief time we had together. Our show and our lives are vastly richer for his having been in them." In the eighth episode of season 1, a memoriam is made in his honor at the end of the credits roll. The character of Peter Gregory was not killed off until the premiere of Season 2.

The show refers to a metric in comparing the compression rates of applications called the Weissman score, which did not exist before the show's run. It was created by Stanford Professor Tsachy Weissman and graduate student Vinith Misra at the request of the show's producers.

Clay Tarver was named co-showrunner in April 2017 alongside Mike Judge and Alec Berg, also serving as an executive producer. In May 2017, it was announced that T.J. Miller would be exiting the series after the fourth season.

Reception

Critical response

Silicon Valley has received critical acclaim since its premiere. Rotten Tomatoes presented the first season with a 95% "Certified Fresh" rating and an average score of 7.94 out of 10 based on 57 reviews, with the critical consensus "Silicon Valley is a relevant, often hilarious take on contemporary technology and the geeks who create it that benefits from co-creator Mike Judge's real-life experience in the industry." Metacritic, a website that gathers critics' reviews, presents the first season with an 84 out of 100 Metascore based on 36 reviews, indicating "universal acclaim".

Tim Goodman of The Hollywood Reporter said "HBO finds its best and funniest full-on comedy in years with this Mike Judge creation, and it may even tap into that most elusive thing, a wide audience." Matt Roush of TV Guide said "The deft, resonant satire that helped make Judge's Office Space a cult hit takes on farcical new dimension in Silicon Valley, which introduces a socially maladroit posse of computer misfits every bit the comic equal of The Big Bang Theorys science nerds." Emily VanDerWerff of The A.V. Club said "It feels weirdly like a tech-world Entourage—and that's meant as more of a compliment than it seems." Brian Tallerico of RogerEbert.com praised the jokes of the series but commented on the slow progression of the character development in the first two episodes and the reliance on common stereotypes in technology, including "the nerd who can't even look at a girl much less talk to her or touch her, the young businessman who literally shakes when faced with career potential." He went on to say that the lack of depth to the characters creates "this odd push and pull; I want the show to be more realistic but I don't care about these characters enough when it chooses to be so."

David Auerbach of Slate stated that the show did not go far enough to be called risky or a biting commentary of the tech industry. "Because I'm a software engineer, Silicon Valley might portray me with my pants up to my armpits, nerdily and nasally complaining that Thomas' compression algorithm is impossible or that nine times F in hexadecimal is 87, not 'fleventy five' (as Erlich says), but I would forgive such slips in a second if the show were funny." Auerbach claimed that he used to work for Google, and that his wife also worked for them at the time of the review.

The second season received critical acclaim. On Metacritic, the season has a score of 86 out of 100 based on nine reviews. On Rotten Tomatoes, the season holds a 96% approval rating with an average rating of 8.51 out of 10 based on 23 reviews. The site's consensus reads, "Silicon Valley re-ups its comedy quotient with an episode that smooths out the rough edges left behind by the loss of a beloved cast member."

The third season also received critical acclaim. On Rotten Tomatoes, the season has a 100% approval rating with an average rating of 8.78 out of 10 based on 24 reviews. The site's consensus reads, "Silicon Valleys satirical take on the follies of the tech industry is sharper than ever in this very funny third season." On Metacritic, the season has a score of 90 out of 100 based on 15 reviews, indicating "universal acclaim".

The series continued to receive critical acclaim in its fourth season. On Rotten Tomatoes, the season's approval rating is 94%, with an average rating of 7.64 out of 10 based on 34 reviews. The site's consensus reads, "Silicon Valleys fourth season advances the veteran comedy's overall arc while adding enough new wrinkles – and delivering more than enough laughs – to stay fresh." On Metacritic, the season has a score of 85 out of 100 based on 10 reviews, indicating "universal acclaim".

The fifth season received generally positive reviews from critics. On Rotten Tomatoes, the season's approval rating dipped to 89%, with an average rating of 7.25 out of 10 based on 28 reviews. The site's consensus reads, "Five seasons in, Silicon Valley finds a new way to up the ante with tighter, less predictable plots, while still maintaining its clever brand of comedic commentary." On Metacritic, the season has a score of 73 out of 100 based on 5 reviews.

The sixth and final season received very positive reviews from critics. On Rotten Tomatoes, the season's approval is 94%, with an average rating of 7 out of 10 based on 18 reviews. The site's consensus reads, "Though the strangeness of reality threatens to one-up it, Silicon Valleys final season is funny, fearless, and still playing by its own rules to the very end." On Metacritic, the season has a score of 78 out of 100 based on 4 reviews.

Other reactions
Businessman Elon Musk, after viewing the first episode of the show, said: "I really feel like Mike Judge has never been to Burning Man, which is Silicon Valley [...] If you haven't been, you just don't get it. You could take the craziest L.A. party and multiply it by a thousand, and it doesn't even get close to what's in Silicon Valley. The show didn't have any of that." In response to Musk's comments, actor T.J. Miller, who plays Erlich on the show, pointed out that "if the billionaire power players don't get the joke, it's because they're not comfortable being satirized... I'm sorry, but you could tell everything was true. You guys do have bike meetings, motherfucker." Other software engineers who also attended the same premiere stated that they felt like they were watching their "reflection". Musk later changed his mind on the show. He said "It starts to get very accurate around episode 4...so it took a few episodes to kinda get grounded. The first episodes struck me as Hollywood making fun of Hollywood's idea of Silicon Valley...which is not on point. But by about the 4th or 5th episode of Season 1 it starts to get good, and by Season 2, it's amazing."

In January 2017, in an audience interaction by Bill Gates and Warren Buffett, Gates recounted the episode in Silicon Valley in which the protagonists try to pitch their product to various venture capitalists, saying it reminded him of his own experiences. Gates would later go on to have a cameo in the series finale.

In conference talks, Douglas Crockford has called Silicon Valley "the best show ever made about programming". He goes on to cite the episode "Bachmanity Insanity" to illustrate the absurdity of the tabs versus spaces argument.

Accolades

Home media
The complete first season was released on DVD and Blu-ray on March 31, 2015; bonus features include audio commentaries and behind-the-scenes featurettes. The second season was released on DVD and Blu-ray on April 19, 2016; bonus features include six audio commentaries, a behind-the-scenes featurette, and deleted scenes. The third season was released on DVD and Blu-ray on April 11, 2017; bonus features include deleted scenes. The fourth season was released on DVD and Blu-ray on September 12, 2017; bonus features include deleted scenes.

International broadcast
In Australia, the series premiered on April 9, 2014, and aired on The Comedy Channel. In the United Kingdom, it premiered on July 16, 2014, airing on Sky Atlantic, while also being available on internet view-on-demand services such as Blinkbox. In New Zealand, the series airs on SoHo (owned by Sky Network Television Limited) and the series is available for streaming on Sky GO and NEON. In India, the series is available for streaming on Hotstar.

References

External links

 
 
 Silicon Valley on Rotten Tomatoes
 In-universe websites: Pied Piper, Hooli, Code/Rag, Aviato, Homicide, BreamHall

 
2014 American television series debuts
2019 American television series endings
2010s American single-camera sitcoms
2010s American workplace comedy television series
English-language television shows
HBO original programming
Television series about computing
Television series by 3 Arts Entertainment
Television series by Home Box Office
Television series created by Dave Krinsky
Television series created by John Altschuler
Television series created by Mike Judge
Television shows set in Santa Clara County, California